= Quarino =

Quarino was an African-born inhabitant of New Providence, Bahamas who was part of a slave revolt.

In 1734, after running away from his plantation, Quarino allegedly traveled to different settlements to recruit participants in a revolt. He was finally captured by soldiers, killing one with a knife.

During his interrogation, Quarino revealed a plot to kill all the white inhabitants of the island and take control of it. The first target was to be the acting Governor, Richard Fitzwilliam.
